Tønder (German: Tondern, North Frisian: Tuner) is a municipality (Danish, kommune) in Region of Southern Denmark on the Jutland peninsula in south Denmark. The municipality covers an area of 1,252 km2, and has a total population of 36,849 (2022).  Its mayor is Henrik Frandsen, a member of the Venstre (Liberal Party) political party.

The main town and the site of its municipal council is the town of Tønder. It consists of six old municipalities, the former Tønder municipality (1970-2006) with 12,706 inhabitants in January 2000 on 184.59 square kilometers among them.

Subdivision
 Abild Parish
 Hostrup Parish
 Møgeltønder Parish
 Tønder Parish
 Ubjerg Parish

Locations

History
On 1 January 2007, Tønder municipality was enlarged as the result of  Kommunalreformen ("The Municipal Reform" of 2007) when the Bredebro, Højer, Løgumkloster, Nørre-Rangstrup (without Bevtoft Parish), and Skærbæk municipalities were merged into the new Tønder municipality.

Politics
Tønder's municipal council consists of 31 members, elected every four years. The municipal council has seven political committees.

Municipal council
Below are the municipal councils elected since the Municipal Reform of 2007.

North Schleswig Germans
Tønder Municipality is home to the only officially recognised ethno-linguistic minority of Denmark proper, the North Schleswig Germans. This minority makes up about 6% of the total population of the municipalities of Aabenraa/Apenrade, Haderslev/Hadersleben, Sønderborg/Sonderburg and Tønder/Tondern. In these four municipalities, the German minority enjoys certain linguistic rights in accordance with the European Charter for Regional or Minority Languages.

References

 Municipal statistics: NetBorger Kommunefakta, delivered from KMD aka Kommunedata (Municipal Data)
 Municipal mergers and neighbors: Eniro new municipalities map

External links

 Municipality's official website

 
Municipalities of the Region of Southern Denmark
Municipalities of Denmark
Populated places established in 2007